The Wolf's Call is a 2019 French action thriller film directed and written by Antonin Baudry. The film is about a submarine's sonar operator Chanteraide (François Civil), who must use his brilliant sense of hearing to track down a French ballistic missile submarine and end the threat of nuclear war.

Plot 
The French submarine Titan - Titane (Titanium) in the original French version - is sent near the Mediterranean coast of Tartus, Syria to stealthily recover a French Special Forces unit operating in the area. The submarine sails under the command of Captain Grandchamp and Executive Officer (XO) D'Orsi. However, during their mission they encounter an unidentified sonar contact. The sonar expert of the submarine, Chanteraide — nicknamed "Socks", and serving as "golden ear", the officer specialized in underwater acoustics — first classifies the contact as a wounded whale, but it quickly turns out that the contact is an unknown submarine transmitting their position to an Iranian frigate and a maritime helicopter operating in the area. The helicopter launches depth charges in what seems to be an unprovoked act of aggression which, however, is a valid defensive measure as the Titan is in fact violating sovereign Syrian waters while recovering a foreign force that has already engaged in combat and killed Syrian nationals. After evading the barrage, the Titan surfaces, and the captain shoots down the helicopter with a Panzerfaust 3. They recover the Special Forces unit and return to base.

When the Titan returns to base, the radio announces that Russia is invading Finland's Åland Islands, and that the French President has decided to send a naval task force to the Baltic Sea in support of Finland. The Russian government then threatens nuclear retaliation against the French Republic. Chanteraide, trying to identify the unknown contact in Syria, hacks into his superior officer's computer and after conducting research at a bookstore where he starts a romantic relationship with Diane, as well as the naval archives, discovers that it is in fact a Russian Timour III ballistic missile submarine, supposedly dismantled. Meanwhile, Grandchamp is promoted for his actions to command Formidable - Effroyable (Dreadful) in the original French version - while D'Orsi takes over command of Titan.

The Formidable is launched with its new captain with the Titan as its escort submarine. Chanteraide is pulled aside during roll call and Grandchamp explains he has failed his drug test and will not be boarding the submarine. Chanteraide distresses at the now empty dock but after an air raid siren sounds, runs into the bunker where the naval staff have relocated. The French military command detects a Russian R-30 nuclear missile being launched by the Timour III from the Bering Sea, prompting the French President to order the Formidable to launch one of its nuclear missiles against Russia in response.

In the command bunker, Chanteraide finds an anomaly while listening to the record of the launch - the missile sounds too light, because it was launched without a nuclear warhead. Chanteraide and his superior officer immediately call the admiral in command of the Strategic Oceanic Force (the ALFOST), but the ALFOST puts them on hold as the US Secretary of State has also called. The Secretary of State reveals critical intelligence that the terrorist organisation Al-Jadida had illegally bought the decommissioned Timour III submarine from a corrupt admiral and launched an empty missile at France, tricking the French into an irrevocable procedure to launch a nuclear counterstrike from the Formidable. The ALFOST and Chanteraide are then flown by helicopter to the Titan in an attempt to stop the nuclear launch by all means necessary.

Grandchamp prepares to fire the nuclear missile, following procedure and eliminating all outside communication while keeping the submarine in stealth mode. After D'Orsi is rebuffed in his efforts to communicate with Grandchamp via underwater telephone, he attempts to approach Formidable by swimming to it in person. He is killed when Grandchamp launches a torpedo at Titan to prevent their attempts to foil his missile launch. This torpedo grazes the Titan and only causes minor damage. Titan then launches their own torpedo at Formidable. Formidable then returns fire. While Chanteraide breaks down under the pressure of targeting his former commander, the ALFOST is able to use his experience from formerly commanding Formidable to predict Grandchamp's evasive actions. Titan's torpedo explodes above the Formidable's bridge, as Grandchamp is able to release ballast air and throw the torpedo enough off target to prevent direct impact, although the control room is devastated. Formidable's torpedo hits Titan which begins to sink.

Grandchamp orders the evacuation of the carbon monoxide filled control room and denies appeals to issue an SOS call, intending to follow orders and launch the nuclear missile first. On the Titan, Chanteraide and the ALFOST, the sole survivors of the torpedo impact, escape the burning area of the ship, Chanteraide makes a last call to the Formidable over underwater telephone. Chanteraide recalls Grandchamp's prior trust in him, and begs him not to fire the missile, before saying goodbye in the face of his impending death on the stricken Titan. With his dying breath, Grandchamp removes the nuclear targeting board, preventing the missile from being launched. The ALFOST is able to evacuate Chanteraide via the escape hatch, but is unable to evacuate himself. As Chanteraide surfaces in a lifejacket, his eardrums are destroyed. Chanteraide is rescued by a helicopter. A deaf Chanteraide attends a memorial held on a submarine for the fallen French sailors. The final scene shows Chanteraide reuniting with his girlfriend Diane.

Production 
Some scenes in the film are photographed in actual French submarines.

Cast 
 François Civil as Chanteraide/"Socks"
 Omar Sy as Commander D'Orsi
 Mathieu Kassovitz as the Admiral (ALFOST)
 Reda Kateb as Captain Grandchamp
 Paula Beer as Diane
 Alexis Michalik as Executive Officer of the SSBN Formidable  
 Jean-Yves Berteloot as CIRA Commander
 Damien Bonnard as Navigator of the SSBN Formidable
 Marc Ruchmann as Officer of the SSBN Formidable

Reception
The reviewer Anthony Kao from Cinema Escapist states that the film's military sequence depict a "more muscular France" with "French hard power" acting as part of a "more militarily assertive Europe", noting that these political storylines are influenced by director Antonin Baudry having "previously served as a high-ranking French diplomat." Kao states that even though the film has an "...ambitious plot that spans multiple vessels, naval bases, and countries, it never gets weighed down or overly hard to follow", which contrasts from the typical French art film that North American audiences associate with that country, which is usually "esoteric and inaccessible."

Reviewer Brenden Gallagher from The Daily Dot calls the film "tense submarine warfare for Tom Clancy fans", a reference to Clancy's submarine classic The Hunt for the Red October. Gallagher calls The Wolf's Call "...pulse-pounding action and military intrigue on a level you just don’t see from Hollywood filmmaking anymore" that is, while being "familiar and predictable", still a "well-constructed" movie. He states that while the film's $22 million production budget is much lower than a similar US film would get, the French film does well within its budgetary constraints.

The site's critical consensus reads, "The Wolf's Call  is a classic submarine action-thriller that will keep you at the edge of your seat."

Notes

References

External links 
 

2019 films
2019 action thriller films
2010s French-language films
Pathé films
Submarine films
French action thriller films
Films set in Syria
Films set in the Baltic Sea
Films about nuclear war and weapons
Films scored by Tomandandy
2010s French films